In linguistics, an unaccusative verb is an intransitive verb whose grammatical subject is not a semantic agent. In other words, the subject does not actively initiate, or is not actively responsible for, the action expressed by the verb. An unaccusative verb's subject is semantically similar to the direct object of a transitive verb or to the subject of a verb in the passive voice.

Examples in English are "the tree fell"; "the window broke". In those sentences, the action (falling, breaking) can be considered as something that happened to the subject, rather than being initiated by it. Semantically, the word "tree" in the sentence "the tree fell" plays a similar role as it does in a transitive sentence, such as "they cut down the tree", or its passive transformation "the tree was cut down". Unaccusative verbs thus contrast with unergative verbs, such as run or resign, which describe actions voluntarily initiated by the subject. They are called unaccusative because although the subject has the semantic role of a patient, it is not assigned accusative case.

In nominative–accusative languages, the accusative case, which marks the direct object of transitive verbs, usually represents the non-volitional argument (often the patient). However, for unaccusative verbs, although the subject is non-volitional, it is not marked by the accusative. As Perlmutter points out, the same verb such as "slide" can be either unaccusative or unergative, depending on whether the action was involuntary or voluntary. The term "unaccusative verb" was first used in a 1978 paper by David M. Perlmutter of the University of California, San Diego.  Perlmutter credited the linguist Geoffrey K. Pullum with inventing the terms "unaccusative" and "unergative".

History of the concept

Perlmutter's unaccusative hypothesis (1978) 
The derivation of the core properties of unaccusative constructions from a set of principles is one of the topmost issues of the agenda of modern syntax since the seminal work by Perlmutter 1978 (cf. Burzio 1986 and Hale-Keyser 2003 for landmark proposals). Perlmutter introduced the "Unaccusative Hypothesis" in 1978 explaining that intransitive verbs are not homogeneous, but can be categorized into either an unaccusative verb or an unergative verb. The Unaccusative Hypothesis was later integrated into the Government and Binding Theory by Burzio (1986). The Unaccusative Hypothesis (UH) argues that the Object of the sentence becomes the Subject in the derivation, meanwhile unergatives start as subjects. More specifically, the first approach introduced by the Unaccusative Hypothesis arrived at an important consequence constituting an analogy between English passive voice constructions and unaccusative constructions whereas in the second approach a more radical theory was proposed based on the analysis of expletive there stemming from the sentences with the copula suggested in Moro 1997.

Acquisition of unaccusatives 
While L2 learners have difficulties with the distinction between unaccusative and unergative verbs, children when learning their first language do not encounter those same difficulties. Studies have shown that children as young as 2 years old can distinguish between unaccusative and unergative verbs. Tests have been done on 2 year olds in Hebrew and Portuguese (Friedmann 2007), on 4 & 5 year olds in German and Dutch (van Hout, 1996; Randall, van Hout, Baayen & Weissenborn, 2004), 2 & 3 year olds in Italian and French (Lorusso, Caprin, and Guasti 2004, Snyder et al., 1995), and 3 - 6 year olds in Russian (using Genitive-of-Negation tests) (Babyonyshev et al. 2001). These studies all concluded that children from a young age are able to differentiate between unaccusatives, unergatives, and transitives.

Split Intransitivity 
Further linguistic studies have shown that intransitive verbs will identify as either unergative or unaccusative, determined by the language. A recent study proposed by James Baker in 2019 suggests that intransitive verbs not only identify as either unaccusative or unergative, but with multiple different classes. According to Baker, the Split Intransitivity analysis has various advantages over the traditional approach in terms of argument structure. The original traditional hypothesis proposed by Levin & Rappaport-Hovav in 1995 mentions linking rules referring to either an external or internal argument. In Split Intransitivity, Baker introduces additional components to the processing of unaccusative verbs he calls Initiation, State, and Change.

Oshita's unaccusative trap hypothesis (1997, 2001) 
The Unaccusative Trap Hypothesis, developed by Oshita in 1997 and 2001, proposes to bring several unaccusative-related phenomena cross-linguistically and to address L2 acquisition on unaccusative verbs. According to Oshita, L2 learners undergo a 3-step process before they have the knowledge to distinguish between unaccusative and unergative verbs. In the Unaccusative Trap Hypothesis, at the first stage, unaccusatives are acquired as unergatives in L2 learners. In the second stage, L2 learners realize and become awakened to the natural linking rules proposed by Levin and Rappaport Havov in 1995. Even in this second stage, there is a stage of syntactic confusion with derivations into the sentence structure. Since Unaccusatives have different syntactic rules for their target languages, the non-target interlanguage phenomena for Japanese or other languages, for example, will be different than those observed in English. Oshita mentions that L2 learners must unlearn non-target syntactic operations and reach the third stage. By this stage, they are out of confusion and can understand unaccusative constructions natively. This study, discussed by Junhua Mo in 2020, analyzed the Unaccusative Trap Hypothesis with L2 English learners and calls for further study. The linking rules associated proposed by Levin and Rappaport Hovav were only effective for L1 acquisition of English, not applicable to L2 acquisition.

Neural correlates of unaccusative Verbs 
According to linguistic theory, unaccusative verbs have sentences that undergo lexical and syntactic operations that do not occur with unergative and transitives. A recent study in 2010 by Friedmann, Shetreet, and Hadar explains and supports this linguistic theory by showing that there are two separate activation locations from unaccusative and unergative verbs in the brain. This study focused on neural correlations of linguistic distinction between Unaccusatives and Unergatives. This study was taken from participants who were tested in their native language, Hebrew. The differences between Unaccusative and Unergative (and transitive) verbs arose from differences in syntactic and lexical derivations.

Structure

Unaccusative and unergative verbs, while syntactically different, are communicated the same on the surface. They both include a noun phrase (NP) followed by a verb phrase (VP) when produced. In generative grammar, an unaccusative verb is analysed as having an underlying VP shell in which the NP is selected by the bottom-most VP and later moved. For an unergative verb, on the other hand, the NP is selected by the topmost VP in a VP shell, and therefore is not required to move to create a surface level order of the noun being followed by the verb. The image to the right demonstrates how the noun in an unaccusative is the direct object of the sentence, as it is selected by the VP as a complement, whereas the noun in an unergative is the subject of the sentence.

Auxiliary selection as a test for unaccusativity 
The unaccusative/unergative split in intransitive verbs can be characterized semantically. Unaccusative verbs tend to express a telic and dynamic change of state or location, while unergative verbs tend to express an agentive activity (not involving directed movement). While these properties define the "core" classes of unaccusatives and unergatives, there are intermediate classes of verbs whose status is less clear (for example, verbs of existence, appearance, or continuation, verbs denoting uncontrolled processes, or motion verbs).

A number of syntactic criteria for unaccusativity have also been identified. The most well-known test is auxiliary selection in languages that use two different temporal auxiliaries (have and be) for analytic past/perfect verb forms (e.g. German, Dutch, French, Italian; even Early Modern English). In these languages, unaccusative verbs combine with be, while unergative verbs combine with have.

 French:
 unaccusative:  lit. "I am fallen." (= "I have fallen.")
 unergative:  "I have worked."

 Italian:
 unaccusative:  lit. "[He] is arrived." (= "He has arrived.")
 unergative:  "[He] has phoned."

From one language to another, however, synonymous verbs do not always select the same auxiliary, and even within one language, a single verb may combine with either auxiliary (either depending on the meaning/context,  or with no observable semantic motivation, sometimes depending on regional variation of the language). The auxiliary selection criterion therefore also identifies core classes of unaccusative and unergatives (which show the least variation within and across languages) and more peripheral classes (where variation and context effects are observed). There are languages which do not have auxiliary selection, such as Russian, and therefore other tests sometimes have to be used to determine whether a verb is unaccusative or unergative

Other tests that have been studied involve passivization (see Impersonal passive voice), ne/en cliticization in Italian and French, and impersonal, participial, and resultative constructions in a wide range of languages.

For example, in Dutch and Turkish, unergative verbs can be used in impersonal passive constructions, but unaccusative verbs cannot. In the following example from Dutch, the verb is unergative, describing a voluntary action, and can be made passive:
Er wordt hier veel geskied.
"A lot of skiing is done here." (lit. "it is skied much here")

But a sentence with an unaccusative verb, such as "The concert lasted a long time", cannot be made passive.

In Japanese, the grammaticality of sentences that appear to violate syntactic rules may signal the presence of an unaccusative verb. According to transformational models of grammar, such sentences contain a trace located in the direct object position that helps to satisfy the mutual c-command condition between numeral quantifiers and the noun phrases they modify (Tsujimura, 2007).

Unaccusativity in English

Tests for English unaccusative verbs
Modern English only uses one perfect auxiliary (have), although archaic examples like "He is fallen/come" reflect the use of be with unaccusative verbs in earlier stages of the language. The identification of unaccusative verbs in English is therefore based on other criteria, notably:

 Many unaccusative verbs alternate with a corresponding transitive verb, where the unaccusative subject appears in direct object position.
 melted. ≈  melted .
  broke. ≈  broke .
 Past participles of unaccusative verb can be used as a nominal modifier with active meaning. This is not possible with unergative past participles, as indicated by the asterisk (*).

The subject of an unaccusative verb can be modified by a resultative adjunct. This is a property shared by direct objects and passive subjects, but not shared by the subjects of unergative and transitive verbs.

While "to die" has been classified as an unaccusative verb, like "to fall" and "to arrive", Dąbrowska (2016) noted that "to die" is an example of Unaccusative Mismatch, because "to die"  behaves:
 unaccusatively in some tests, e.g. (!)There laughed  in the room (unergative) vs. There appeared  on the scene (unaccusative) vs. There died ; 
 yet unergatively in others, e.g.  died vs. (!) died .

Types of English unaccusative verbs
Perlmutter (1978) gives examples of various types of unaccusative verbs. He emphasises that the following categories are not definitive, and that alternative classifications are possible.

Perlmutter points out that some verbs can be used in either unaccusative or unergative clauses. If the action is deliberate or willed, the clause is unergative:
The figurine stood on this table. – (unaccusative)
The children stood on this table. – (unergative)

Unaccusativity in Russian 

Unlike the subtle evidence for unaccusatives in English, Russian provides strong tests to determine unaccusativity.
The four tests for unaccusativity in Russian are:
po-phrases
na-phrases
Locative Inversion
Genitive-of-Negation (GN)

When the subject of an unaccusative verb appears in a po-phrase, the verb will lack subject-verb agreement. This construction would be ungrammatical for unergatives, causing a distinction to be able to be seen between unaccusatives and unergatives.

Na-phrases affect the interpretation of the internal arguments of the verb. This would be the NP in the direct object position of a transitive verb or the NP in the subject position of an unaccusative verb, once again creating a clear distinction between unaccusatives and unergatives.

Locative Inversion (Babyonyshev 1996) is a construction that is only possible for the NPs in the position of the subject of unaccusative verbs.
With these three tests, while they do distinguish unaccusatives from unergatives, they are seldom used in everyday speech.

In contrast, Genitive-of-Negation, is frequently used by Russian speakers in both spoken and written language. The genitive case can be used both for the direct objects of transitive verbs and the subjects of unaccusative verbs while the sentence is being negated. This grammatical case is not allowed to be used for the NPs in the subject position of transitive and transitive verbs, and with unergative verbs.

Morphosyntactic alignment and unaccusative verbs 

Unaccusative verbs are generally more readily identifiable in ergative-absolutive languages, such as Basque, since the subject of unaccusative verbs is inflected similarly to direct objects.
 By contrast, nominative-accusative languages, such as Japanese mark the subject of unaccusative verbs agentively.

Examples in Basque

In example (a), the verb apurtu is unaccusative, and the noun edalontzi appears in the object position, and is marked in the absolutive case. In example (b), the verb is transitive, and we see the subject Jon marked in the ergative case. The auxiliary verb used in either case is also different. The same case markings auxiliary variations appear in an unaccusative/unergative setting, on the same noun:

In the unaccusative setting (a), Jon is marked in the absolutive case; in the unergative setting (b), Jon is marked in the ergative case. Note, too, the auxiliary be in the unaccusative setting and the auxiliary have in the unergative setting.

Examples in Georgian

Similar to Basque, Georgian also features different markings for agent/object nouns in intransitive contexts, but does the verb case remains unchanged. In unaccusative contexts (a), the noun is marked with the active case, while it is marked with the nominative case in unergative contexts.

See also 
Anticausative verb – type of unaccusative
Copula
Deponent verb
Ergative verb – transitive equivalent of unaccusative
Impersonal passive voice
Reflexive verb
Transitivity
Ambitransitive verb – transitive equivalent of unergative
Intransitive verb
Transitive verb
Unergative verb – opposite of unaccusative

References

Further reading
 Lexicon of Linguistics (Utrecht institute of Linguistics)
 
 Everaert, M.; van Riemsdijk, H; Goedemans, R. (eds) 2006 The Blackwell Companion to Syntax, Volumes I–V, Blackwell, London. See "copular sentences" and "existential sentences and expletive there" in Volume II
 
 
 
 
 
 
  
  
  
 

Transitivity and valency